Kevin L. Johnson (born July 15, 1976) is a former professional American football player who played wide receiver in college for Syracuse University then for seven seasons in the NFL for the Cleveland Browns, the Jacksonville Jaguars, the Baltimore Ravens, and the Detroit Lions. 

During his freshman year at Syracuse, Johnson lost a quarterback competition to Donovan McNabb which precipitated a position switch to wide receiver.

Professional career

Following his fourth season, Johnson was drafted by the Cleveland Browns in the second round of the 1999 NFL Draft. He caught a Hail Mary touchdown pass from Tim Couch as time expired against the New Orleans Saints to give the new Cleveland Browns their first win following the team's return to the NFL. Johnson played for the Browns until 2003, when he was cut mid-season by head coach Paul Hilton "Butch" Davis after Johnson had many productive seasons as the Browns leading receiver. Johnson was subsequently claimed by 16 teams, and awarded to the Jaguars. The Jaguars later traded Johnson to the Ravens for a 4th round pick. The Ravens released Johnson after a single season. Johnson then signed as a free agent with the Detroit Lions. In a controversial move, Johnson was issued Number 85, the first time the Lions had issued '85' to a player since the death of Chuck Hughes in 1971. Johnson would only appear in six games during what would be his final season in the NFL in 2005.

Post-NFL
Kevin Johnson spent years developing and constructing a massive multi-use complex in Bordentown, NJ, that includes a fitness center, health offices, as well as housing complex currently under construction. The complex is called Team 85 Campus.

References

1976 births
Living people
American football wide receivers
Hamilton High School West alumni

People from Hamilton Township, Mercer County, New Jersey
Syracuse Orange football players
Cleveland Browns players
Jacksonville Jaguars players
Baltimore Ravens players
Detroit Lions players
Players of American football from Trenton, New Jersey
Sportspeople from Mercer County, New Jersey